The 1980-81 Four Hills Tournament took place at the four traditional venues of Oberstdorf, Garmisch-Partenkirchen, Innsbruck and Bischofshofen, located in Germany and Austria, between 29 December 1980 and 6 January 1981.

Results

Overall

References

External links 
  

Four Hills Tournament
1980 in ski jumping
1981 in ski jumping
1980 in German sport
1981 in German sport
1981 in Austrian sport
Four Hills Tournament
Four Hills Tournament